Turkey competed at the 2005 Summer Universiade in İzmir, Turkey from 11 August to 22 August 2005.  A total of 285 athletes were a part of the Turkish team competing in 14 sports branches.

Turkey won 27 medals (8th place), including ten gold, eleven silver and six bronze medals.

Medal table

Archery

Men's

Women's

Athletics

Men's
24 male athletes competed for Turkey.

Women's
21 female athletes took part at the Games.

Basketball

Men's tournament
Team

Head coach:  Haşim Ali Tümdoğan

Preliminary round
Group A

Playoff round

Final standing

Women's tournament
Team

Head coach:  Muzaffer Kalaycıoğlu

Preliminary round
Group A

|}

Playoff round
Quarterfinals

7th-8th Place

Final standing

Diving

Men's
Sinan Ertekin, Özgür Cengizhan, Öncü Erinç Kuzucu

Fencing

Men's
Can Gülersoy, Mustafa Oğur, Murat narin, Kamil Özdemi, Erdoğan Kızıldağ, Güneş Darıca, Batuhan Sarsılamaz, Erkan Malay, Selçuk Dönerkaya, Gökmert Yapakçı, Hasan İşyar, Adnan Özsanat

Women's
Mine Ergüz, Özden Aslan, Şenay Güner, Semra Deliormanlı, Emel Işık, Pınar Kalaycı, Naile Sevda Varol, Reha Doğan, Ilgın Güçlüce, Kader Yildiz, Nevin Gürdoğan, Ayşe Bekiroğlu

Football

Men's tournament
Team

Head coach:  Ünal Karaman

Group A

Qualification

9th - 10th Place

Final standing

Women's tournament
Team

Head coach:  Ali Kızılet

Group A

Round Robin

Final standing

Gymnastics

Artistic gymnastics
Men's
Haluk Coşkun, Kerem Venedik, Fatih Yıldız, Ekin Takmaz, Cumhur Zorba

Women's
Damla Kırsalı, Ebru Karaduman, Melike Cura, Reyhan Gürses, Özge Yıldırım

Rhythmic gymnastics
Başak Akar, Nihan Şahingöz, Yıldız Avcıbaşı, Sezen Çimen, Özlem Atakan, Merve Sinem Avaz, Deniz Atlı, Demet Tetik, Banu Seri

Sailing

Men's
Güray Zünbül, Koray izer, Cem Duman, Hakan Karakaplan, Efe Karakaplan, Kemal Muslubaş, Deniz Çınar, Ateş Çınar

Women's
Begüm Güngör, Pınar Yılmazer, Yonca Yıldıral, Burcu Balaban, Özüm Oğuzbayır

Swimming

Men's
Emre Çelık, Çağrı Sapmaz, Eren Onurlu, Mert Saygın, Engin Can Eter, Cenk Aktaş, Serkan Aydın, Aytekin Mindan, Gökhan Hülagü, Cem Paşaoğlu, Onat Tungaç, Kaan Tayla, Arda Köstem

Women's
İlkay Dikmen, Burcu Dolunay, Derya Erke, Gizem Algiş, Fulya Terzi, Selin Bülbül, Sibel Piroğlu, Gamze Uçar, Gülşah Gönenç, Tuğçe Duygun, Jülide Yıldız, Zeynep Evrim İstan

Taekwondo

Men's

Women's

Tennis

Men's

Women's

Mixed

Volleyball

Men's tournament
Team

Head coach:  Nedim Özbey

Playoff round
Quarterfinals

|}

Semifinal
Quarterfinal match    

|}

Gold medal match
Quarterfinal match         

|}

Final standing

Women's tournament
Team

Head coach:  Ali Kızılet

Playoff round
Quarterfinals
     

|}

5th-8th Place match
        

|}

5th Place match
           

|}

Final standing

Water polo

Tournament
Team

Head coach:  Sinan Turunç
Prelimibary Round
Group A

Playoff Round
Quarterfinals

Semifinal

Bronze medal match

Final standing

Wrestling

Men's Freestyle

Men's Greco-Roman

Women's Freestyle

References

Nations at the 2005 Summer Universiade
Summer Universiade
2005